Nymphaea ampla, the dotleaf waterlily, is a species of flowering plant in the family Nymphaeaceae. It is native to Texas, Florida, Mexico, Central America, the Caribbean, and northern and western South America. 

Nymphaea ampla is widely represented in Mayan art, especially in its depictions with jaguars and Mayan kings. Its cultural importance can be seen in one of the Mayan names of the plant; nikte’ha’ ("vulva of the water") as it would have represented life, sexual activity, fertility, and birth. The plant causes opiate-like effects on the user and is known to have been used as a calmative and mild trance inducer.

References

ampla
Freshwater plants
Entheogens
Flora of Texas
Flora of Florida
Flora of Mexico
Flora of Central America
Flora of the Caribbean
Flora of northern South America
Flora of western South America
Plants described in 1821